Simplemente (Galician or Spanish for "simply")  may refer to:

 Simplemente (Chayanne album), 2001
 "Simplemente", the album's title track
 Simplemente (El Tri album), 1984

See also